The Bristol pound (£B) was a form of local, complementary, and/or community currency launched in Bristol, UK on 19 September 2012. Its objective is to encourage people to spend their money with local, independent businesses in Bristol, and for those businesses to in turn localise their own supply chains. At the point of the close of the digital scheme in August 2020, it was the largest alternative in the UK to official sterling currency, and is backed by sterling.

The digital currency ceased operating in August 2020 and Bristol pound accounts have reverted to sterling accounts at the Bristol Credit Union. The Bristol Pound CIC is now in the process of developing Bristol Pay, which seeks to both offer an e-money peer to peer payment platform that can generate income for charitable projects in the city, and to create a range of token systems to encourage a culture change in how people think about economic value in relation to social capital and environmental capital. The final issue of the paper currency remains in date until 30 September 2021, but given that many businesses are trying to reduce the risk of fomite transmission of COVID-19, the paper currency is no longer being issued. Souvenir notes are still available through the Bristol pound website.

Background

The Bristol pound is a local, complementary, and/or community currency that was created to "improve Bristol's local economy". Its primary aim is to support independent traders in order to maintain diversity in business around the city. The scheme was a joint not-for-profit enterprise between Bristol Pound Community Interest Company and Bristol Credit Union.

Previous to the Bristol pound, local currencies were launched in the UK in Totnes (2006), Lewes (2008), Brixton (2009) and Stroud (2010).

Effect on the local economy

Theory

According to a 2002 New Economics Foundation publication, money that is re-spent locally is '... the same as attracting new money into that area.' If a person spends a pound at a local shop, the owner of this shop can re-spend it by buying supplies from another local business, or paying local taxes (Business Rates or Council Tax) to the council. The process can be repeated with exchanges kept within the local economy. This local circulation can lead to additional economic benefits for the area; this is called the local multiplier effect. In comparison, sterling pounds spent at a supermarket chain typically leads to more than 80% of the money leaving the area almost immediately.

As well as potentially stimulating the local economy it can create stronger bonds within the community; by increasing social capital. Buying locally can decrease emissions as locally produced good require less transportation. Local trade through the use of complementary currencies can be a resilience strategy; reducing impact of national economic crises and dependency on international trade, and enhancing self-sufficiency. It can also increase the awareness of the impact of one's economic activity.

Research
In 2017, the Bristol Post reported on some research that suggested the Bristol pound venture is too small to effect significant change in localism and has not increased local wealth or the production. A spokesperson for the Bristol Pound claimed the findings contradicted previous research by the University of Bristol.

Usage
Bristol was the first city in the UK in which taxes and business rates could be paid in a local currency. Bristol pound account holders can convert £Bs to and from sterling at a 1:1 ratio. Bristol City Council, and other organisations in the city, offer their employees the option to take part of their salaries in Bristol pounds. The former Mayor of Bristol, George Ferguson, accepted his entire salary (£51,000) in Bristol pounds.

From June 2015 energy bills were able to be paid in Bristol pounds to the 100% renewable energy provider, Good Energy. Its CEO claimed it is a world first for paying energy bills using a local currency.

In June 2015, according to the Bristol Pound CEO, some £1 million had been issued in £Bs, with more than £B700,000 still in circulation. More than 800 businesses accept Bristol Pounds and more than a thousand users have a Bristol pound account.

By late 2017, five million Bristol pounds had been spent. However, by this stage, usage of the currency was beginning to decline.

In March 2020, the Bristol Post reported that the currency faced an uncertain future. However, as at April 2021, Bristol Pound CIC still exists and is  focused on developing a new range of money and token based systems to continue its wider mission of helping to create a local economy that is environmentally sustainable, socially just and resilient to external shocks.

Organisation and partnerships

The Bristol pound is managed by the non-profit Bristol Pound Community Interest Company in collaboration with the local financial institution, the Bristol Credit Union. The Bristol Credit Union ensures that every £1 sterling converted to a printed £B1 is backed in a secure trust fund. The scheme is supported by Bristol City Council, although the council had substantially reduced any financial support from 2018.

Bristol pound was involved in the Digipay4Growth project, coordinated by the Social Trade organisation and with partners such as Sardex. Through this project Bristol pounds digitalised its currency, using Cyclos software.

Bristol pound is part of a larger international movement of local currencies. The European funded Community Currencies in Action partnership provided support for communities which want to develop their new currency and works on innovations. Within the UK, Bristol Pound CIC founded the Guild of Independent Currencies – a platform for sharing experiences about local currencies - which later became the Independent Money Alliance. In this framework, Bristol CIC assisted Exeter, amongst others, helping it to launch its own local currency; the Exeter Pound. Whilst this formal group no longer exists, the Bristol pound CIC remains closely linked to other new economy and local currency groups in the UK, Europe and around the world.

Using the Bristol Pound

The Bristol pound was used in both paper and electronic format, like conventional money. One Bristol pound is equivalent to one sterling pound. Some businesses apply discounts for customers paying in Bristol pounds. Local taxes and electricity bills can be paid with Bristol pounds online.

Paper Bristol Pounds

Paper £Bs can be used by anyone, have been designed by Bristolians, and carry many high security features to prevent fraud. In June 2015 new paper £Bs were issued. These can be exchanged at a 1:1 rate for sterling at seventeen different cash points throughout the city, or ordered online through the Bristol pound website.

Electronic payments

The Bristol pound was the second local scheme (after the Brixton pound) to be able to accept electronic payments in the UK. This allows, for example, participating small businesses to accept payments by SMS, without needing to pay for and install a credit card machine. The businesses were latterly charged 1% of the amount billed for payments made by SMS, a similar or sometimes reduced rate than with credit or debit cards, or PayPal (3%). Payments can also be made online, with the recipient of each payment charged at a rate of 1%, capped at 95p per transaction.

Legality

Every paper £B is backed up by £1 sterling deposited at Bristol Credit Union. The Bristol pound is not legal tender, and participation is therefore voluntary. The directors of the scheme cannot prevent national and multinational companies accepting paper £Bs, but can decide, based on the Rules of Membership, whether a business is permitted to open a Bristol pound account and trade electronically.

Bristol pounds can only be exchanged back into sterling via an electronic Bristol pound account. There is no fee for doing this. Paper Bristol Pounds cannot be directly exchanged back to sterling unless first deposited into an electronic account. Technically, the notes are vouchers and the first issue of the paper Bristol pounds also have an expiry date (30 September 2015). The Bank of England acknowledges the existence and role of local currencies.

Awards
Bristol pound contributed to Bristol being awarded the title of European Green Capital 2015.

See also

Bank Charter Act 1844
Cyclos
Community Currency
Local Currency
Exeter pound
New Economics Foundation
Brixton Pound
Lewes pound
Monero
Stroud pound
Totnes pound
BerkShares
Scrip

References

External links

Bristol
Pound (currency)
2012 establishments in England
2021 disestablishments in England
Local currencies of the United Kingdom
Currencies of England